David Sakurai (Copenhagen, 19 July 1979) is a Danish Japanese actor, director, scriptwriter and martial artist.

Biography
Born in Copenhagen to a Danish mother and a Japanese father and raised in Frederiksværk, Sakurai has a brother named Kristoffer, who is a former dancer. He was interested in filmmaking from a young age and at the age of 18 moved to Japan, where he also learned acting. He played smaller roles in theatre and in indie films, like Tokyo G.P. in 2001 and Scarlet Runaway in 2005.

He returned to Denmark in 2008, mainly because he wanted to work with Jack Hansen and other talented new directors and in his native tongue. Here he continued training under the Danish Actors' Association. He played one of his first leading roles in Eastern Army. He worked with Stellan Skarsgård, Steven Van Zandt and Hans Petter Moland, among others.

In 2012, he starred in Hungarian dark romantic comedy Liza, the Fox-Fairy, which won the Grand Prize at Portuguese film festival Fantasporto in 2015.

He has trained in Wing Chun and Muay Thai, among other martial art styles.

He lives in Los Angeles with his wife.

Filmography
 2006 Skyggen af tvivl (short film) - Lars
 2007 Fighter - fighter
 2009 No Right Turn - waiter
 2010 Tour de Force - Hiru
 2010 Wasteland Tales  - stranger
 "Eastern Army"
 "I Barbari Dei Cph" (scriptwriter, producer)
 2010 Tony Venganza - Shiba
 2011 Hapa (short film) - "self"; (scriptwriter, director, producer)
 2011 Shaky González/The Last Demon Slayer - Jiro (martial arts choreography)
 2012 Emma (short film, Supernatural Tales video) - Bastian
 2012 Ud af mørket - Johnny; (scriptwriter, director, producer)
 2012 Hitman: Absolution (video game) - several characters
 2012–2014 Lilyhammer (Norwegian television series) - Tensing
 2013 Detektiverne (Danish youth thriller) - Sony Kazu
 2014 Kraftidioten - Kinamann
 2014 Echoes of a Ronin (short film) - Shin; (scriptwriter, producer)
 2014 Dark Samurai - Miyamoto
 2015 Liza, the Fox-Fairy (Hungarian dark romantic comedy) - Tomy Tani
 2017 Iron Fist - Scythe
 2018 Unbroken: Path to Redemption - Mutsuhiro “The Bird” Watanabe
 2018 Fantastic Beasts: The Crimes of Grindelwald - Krall
 2018 Origin - Murakawa
 2020 Doorman as Hammer

Awards
 2010 Best Actor and Audience Awards (Eastern Army; Movie Battle Film Festival, Copenhagen)
 2010 Breakout Action Star (Action On Film International Film Festival, Los Angeles)
 2011 GoVisual Award (Hapa, shared with I Am Your Ecstacy; Nordisk Film Festival)

References

External links
 
 
 
 
 Albert Valentin: REVIEW: Echoes of a Ronin (Short) (2014)

1979 births
Danish male film actors
Japanese male film actors
Living people
Danish film directors
Danish male screenwriters
21st-century Danish male actors
Danish people of Japanese descent
People from Frederiksværk
Male actors of Japanese descent
Danish expatriates in the United States